Wong Siew Te (born 16 May 1969) is a Malaysian wildlife biologist known for his studies on the Malayan sun bear and the foundation of the Bornean Sun Bear Conservation Centre in Sandakan, Sabah.

Biography 
Wong Siew Te was born in Bukit Mertajam, Penang on 16 May 1969 as the youngest son of the tailor Wong Soon Kew, who operated the business "Soon Kew Tailor" in Bukit Mertajam from the 1950s to the mid-1980s. He grew up with eight other siblings – four elder brothers and four elder sisters. From 1976 to 1982 he joined Kim Sen Primary School in Bukit Mertajam and from 1982 to 1987 the Jit Sin High School, also in Bukit Mertajam.

He continued his studies 1989 at  Taiwan's National Pingtung University of Science and Technology and received his diploma in Animal Science & Veterinary in 1992.

In 1994, he studied Wildlife Biology at the University of Montana where he graduated as a Bachelor of Science in 1997. In 2002, he graduated as a Master of Science with the thesis The ecology of Malayan sun bear in the lowland tropical rainforest of Sabah, Borneo.

From 2002 to 2005 he co-chaired the Sun Bear Expert Team for the IUCN/SSC Bear Specialist Group, a science-based network of voluntary experts within the International Union for Conservation of Nature and Natural Resources (IUCN).

From 2002 to 2011, he pursued his doctorate in Fish and Wildlife Biology at the University of Montana, and conducted his dissertation entitled The effects of selective logging on bearded pigs (Sus barbatus) in lowland tropical rainforest of Borneo.

In 2008, he founded the Bornean Sun Bear Conservation Centre (BSBCC) in Sepilok, a zoological centre for protection and conservation of the Malayan sun bear. Founded together with the organisation Land Empowerment Animals People (LEAP), the Sabah Wildlife Department (SWD) and the Sabah Forestry Department (SFD), it is a holistic approach to conserve the endangered species.

He was also a fellow of the Flying Elephants Foundation, which awards individuals from a broad range of disciplines within the arts and sciences.

Wong Siew Te now manages the Bornean Sun Bear Conservation Centre as CEO.

Recognitions
Wong was recognised as a wildlife hero featured in the book Wildlife Heroes: 40 Leading Conservationists and the Animals They Are Committed to Saving.

In conjunction with the Penang State Governor 76th birthday in 2014, Wong Siew Te was conferred Darjah Johan Negeri (D.J.N.; Member- Order of the Defender of State) to recognize his contribution to the society and the environment. This Order was instituted in 1969 and conferred on individuals who have contributed outstanding services in any field. This award is limited to one thousand one hundred and fifty living persons, excluding non-Malaysians who may be conferred this award on an honorary basis.

In the same year, Wong also being awarded the 2014 Outstanding Alumni Award by National Pingtung University of Science and Technology, Pingtung, Taiwan, for his outstanding achievement in wildlife conservation.

In September 2016, Wong received an Honorary Doctorate from University of Sunshine Coast, Australia, in recognition of his lifelong contribution on sun bear conservation in Southeast Asia.

Wong's recognitions continue in 2017 when he first was named a "Wira Negaraku" or “My Country Hero” by the Malaysian Prime Minister Office, Federal Government of Malaysia. On July 29, 2017, Wong was name a CNN Hero by global television network CNN.

Selected works
Veron G., M‐L Patou, R. Debruyne, A. Couloux, D. Antonette, P. Fernandez, Siew Te Wong, J. Fuchs, A. P. Jennings. 2014. Systematics of the Southeast Asian mongooses (Herpestidae, Carnivora): solving the mystery of the elusive collared mongoose and Palawan mongoose. Zoological Journal of the Linnean Society 01/2015.
Veron, G., M. Willsch, V. Dacosta, M-L Patou, A. Seymour, C. Bonillo, A. Couloux, S.T. Wong, A.P. Jennings, J. Fickel, and A. Wilting: The distribution of the Malay civet Viverra tangalunga (Carnivora:Viverridae) across Southeast Asia: natural or human-mediated dispersal in: Zoological Journal of the Linnean Society. 170: 917–932. [SCI], 2014
Gitzen, R.A., J.L. Belant, J.J.Millspaugh, S.T. Wong, A.J. Hearn, J. Ross: Effective use of radiolelemetry for studying tropical carnivores. in: The Raffles Bulletin of Zoology: 28: 67–83. 2014
Hanya, G., Stevenson, P., Noordwijk, M.v., Wong, S.T., Kanamori, T., Kuze, N., Aiba. S., Chapman, C., van Schaik, C.: Seasonality in fruit availability affects primate biomass and species richness.  in: Ecography. 34: 1009–1017. [SCI], 2011
 Chen, C.C, Pei, K.J.C., Kuo, M.D., Yang, C.M., Wong, S.T., Lin, F.G., & Kuo, S.C.: A possible case of hantavirus infection in Borneo orangutan (Pongo pygmaeus pygmaeus) and its conservation implication. in: Journal of Medical Primatology. 40(1): 2–5. [SCI], 2010
 Fredriksson, G., Steinmetz, R., Wong, S.T. & Garshelis, D.L.: Helarctos malayanus. in: IUCN 2009. IUCN Red List of Threatened Species. Version 2009.1.
 Wong, S.T. 2006: The status of Malayan sun bear in Malaysia, S. 66–72 in: Japan Bear Network (compiler). 2006. Understanding Asian bears to secure their future, Japan Bear Network, Ibakari, Japan 145 pp., 2006
 Wong, S.T., C. Servheen, L. Ambu, and Norhayati A.: Impacts of fruit production cycle Malayan sun bears and bearded pigs in lowland tropical forests of Sabah, Malaysian Borneo. in: Journal of Tropical Ecology. 21:627–639. [SCI], 2005
 Norhayati, A., I Mila, L., Juliana, S., Wong, S.T. & Shukor, M.N.: Amphibian fauna of Danum Valley Conservation Area. in: Laily B. Din, Muhammad Yahya, Norhayati, A., Nizam, M.S., Waidi Sinun & A. Latiff (eds.): Danum Valley Conservation Area: Physical, Biological and Social Environments., Yayasan Sabah and Universiti Kebangsaan Malaysia, Bangi. p. 281–298.
Norhayati, A., Wong, S.T., Juliana, S. & Shukor, M.N.: An annotated checklist of reptiles in Danum Valley Conservation Area. in: Laily B. Din, Muhammad Yahya, Norhayati, A., Nizam, M.S., Waidi Sinun & A. Latiff (eds.): Danum Valley Conservation Area: Physical, Biological and Social Environments. Yayasan Sabah and Universiti Kebangsaan Malaysia, Bangi. p. 299–312, 2005
Wong, S. T., Servheen, C. & Ambu, L.: Home range, movement and activity patterns, and bedding sites of Malayan Sun Bears Helarctos malayanus in the Rainforest of Borneo. in: Biological Conservation. 119:169–181. [SCI], 2004
Wong, S.T., C. Servheen, and L. Ambu: Food habits of Malayan sun bears in lowland tropical forest of Borneo. in: Ursus. 13:127–136. [SCI], 2002
Lin, Y.R., S.T. Wong, C. J. Pei.: Variations in skull morphology of Formosan Reeve's muntjac in Little Ghost Lake Forest Reserve, Pingtung, Taiwan. in: Notes of Wildlifers and Newsletter of Wildlifers (NOW). 1(4): 8–11. (in Chinese), 1993
Sorenson, J.: Interview with Siew Te Wong. The Brock Review. 12(1): 182–186., 2011
Wong, S. T.: Bornean Sun Bear Conservation Centre in Malaysia Borneo. in: International Bear News. 19(1):18–19, 2010.
Wong, S. T.: Sun Bear: The Forgotten Bear. in: Society & Environment. A monthly magazine published by Zayed International Prize for the Environment. July 2009: 40–42. 
The Emerging Wildlife Conservation Leaders, Wong S.T. & Gabriella Fredriksson. in: Sun Bear Adventure Journals. EWCL. 34 pp., 2006
Wong, S.T. & C. Servheen: The Bornean Sun Bear and Bearded Pig Research and Conservation Project- a new field project to study the effects of selective logging on Malayan sun bears and bearded pigs in Borneo. in: International Bear News. 14(4):24, 2005
Wong, S.T. & C. Servheen: New field project to study the effects of selective logging on bearded pigs and sun bears in Borneo. in: Suiform Soundings. Peccaries, Pigs, and Hippos Specialists Group Newsletter. 5(1):30, 2005.
Wong, S.T.: Dances with sun bears. in: Malayan Naturalist. 56(3): 20–25., 2003. 
Wong, S.T.: Sun bear research on the web. in: International Bear News. 12(2):9., 2003. 
Wong, S. T. and C. Servheen: Malaysia Malayan Sun bear Ecology. in: International Bear News. 8(3):11–12., 1999.

References

External links

 Wong Siew Te: Siew Te Wong's sun bear journal
 wildlifedirect.org: About Siew Te Wong
 mesym.com: Wong Siew Te, on Conserving Sun Bears in Borneo

20th-century zoologists
Malaysian biologists
1969 births
Living people
People from Penang
Malaysian people of Chinese descent
21st-century zoologists